This article is about the demographic features of the population of Barbuda, including population density, internet access, crime rate, and other aspects of the population.

Population 
According to the 2011 census, the population of Barbuda was 1,634.

Other demographics statistics (2011) 

Ethnic groups
 95.11% African descendant
 0.13% Caucasian/White
 0.13% East Indian/India
 2.88% Mixed (Black/White)
 1.00% Mixed (Other)
 0.44% Hispanic
 0.13% Syrian/Lebanese
 0.13% Other
 0.06% Don't know/Not stated

Country of birth
 89.28% of the population were born in Antigua and Barbuda
 0.06% of the population were born in Other Latin or North American countries
 0.44% of the population were born in Other Caribbean countries
 0.44% in Canada
 0.13% in Other European countries
 1.50% Dominica
 0.44% in the Dominican Republic
 2.76% in Guyana
 1.19% in Jamaica
 0.25% in Montserrat
 0.44% in St. Kitts and Nevis
 0.06% in St. Lucia
 0.44% in St. Vincent and the Grenadines
 0.13% in Syria
 0.50% in the United Kingdom
 1.07% in the United States (Not including the USVI)
 0.63% in the United States Virgin Islands
 0.25% Not Stated

Immigration
 1,447 people were born in Antigua and Barbuda, and 170 were foreign born. People who are foreign born make up 10.5% of the Barbudan population.

Education
 67.93% of the population are not in education, while 32.07% were enrolled in full and part time education.

Employment
 76.79% of the population is employed, while 2.83% were seeking work, while the remainder was either unemployed or too young to seek employment.

Health Insurance
 56.25% of the population is covered by a health insurance scheme, while the remainder was not.

Health
 10.75% of the population suffered from allergies of any type, 0% suffered from HIV/AIDS, and 6.45% of the population has diabetes.
 5 Barbudans have cancer, the lowest in the country, compared to 117 sufferers in Saint John or 39 in Saint George.

Housing
 73.59% of Barbudans lived in owner occupied housing, 20.95% in privately rented accommodation, and 10.47% in overcrowded housing.

Air conditioning
 11.01% of households used air conditioning, the second highest amount nationwide, behind Saint John with 16.54%.

Telecommunications
 36.46% of the population are internet users, and 31.89% of households have internet.
 77.46% of households have cable TV, while 2.16% have satellite TV.
 50.36% of households have fixed line telephone.

Crime
 3.87% of the population are victims of any crime (3rd lowest nationwide), with 1.11% being victims of Housebreaking (lowest nationwide), 0.18% being victims of Auto theft (second lowest nationwide), and 1.29% of the population experiencing other crimes (highest nationwide).

Sex ratio
 The sex ratio was 110.42 (males / females x 100).

Active population replacement ratio
 The active population replacement ratio is 254.17 (15-19 / 60-64 x 100).

Dependency ratios
 The old age dependency ratio is 18.29 (60+ / 18-59 x 100).
 The child dependency ratio is 60.72 (<18 / 18-59 x 100), the highest nationwide.

Unemployment and Living Condition Index (Unmet Basic Needs Index)
 Codrington has a Living Condition Index of 14.05 and an unemployment rate of 6.58.
 The rest of the island has a Living Condition Index of 14.52 and an unemployment rate of 2.63.

See also
Demographics of Antigua and Barbuda

References

Barbudans
Demographics of Antigua and Barbuda